Ashley Tackett Laferty is an American attorney and politician serving as a member of the Kentucky House of Representatives from the 95th district. Elected in November 2018, she assumed office on January 1, 2019. Laferty is known for her being a conservative Southern Democrat.

Early life and education 
Laferty was born in Martin, Kentucky. She earned a Bachelor of Arts degree from Eastern Kentucky University and a Juris Doctor from the University of Louisville School of Law.

Career 
Since graduating from law school, Laferty has worked as an attorney. She was elected to the Kentucky House of Representatives in November 2018, defeating incumbent Republican Larry Brown. She assumed office on January 1, 2019.
She was re-elected in 2020 with 60% of the vote, beating Republican challenger William Matt Reynolds and was re-elected in 2022 with 60% of the vote, defeating Republican Brandon Spencer.

References 

Living people
People from Floyd County, Kentucky
Eastern Kentucky University alumni
University of Louisville School of Law alumni
Kentucky lawyers
Democratic Party members of the Kentucky House of Representatives
Women state legislators in Kentucky
Year of birth missing (living people)
21st-century American women